Roode means red in Dutch and may refer to
Roode Els Berg Dam in South Africa
De Roode Duivel, Dutch weekly magazine
Bobby Roode (born 1977), Canadian professional wrestler 
Dewald Roode (1940–2009), South African academic 

Surnames from nicknames